Guegue is a village on São Tomé Island in the nation of São Tomé and Príncipe. Its population is 104 (2012 census). It lies in the interior of the island, 1 km north of Uba Budo and 4 km southeast of Trindade.

References

Populated places in Cantagalo District